The Serbs of Mostar, Bosnia and Herzegovina, numbered about 24,000 at the outbreak of the Bosnian War in 1992, during which a majority of them were forced out, as part of an extensive ethnic cleansing campaign. With the city's post-war division into Croat and Bosniak (Bosnian Muslim) halves, very few Serbs have returned. As a result, its current Serb population, as registered by the 2013 census, numbers 4,421 or about 4.2% of the population of the town.

History

18th and 19th centuries 
In the 18th and 19th centuries, many Serbs from Mostar were merchants and traders. They formed business communities in Vienna, Trieste, Novi Sad, in the Republic of Venice, as well as in the Republic of Ragusa (Dubrovnik), Zara (Zadar) and other towns (See: Triestine Serbs). The resultant wealth lead to a rise in their social status and funded a cultural and artistic flowering. In 1863, the construction of a large new church was begun, the Cathedral of the Holy Trinity. It was initially supervised by the little-known Spasoje Vulić, but was completed by Andrey Damyanov (who was also the builder of the Serbian Orthodox Cathedral in Sarajevo, constructed in a similar style around the same time). The works were financed locally, as well as by wealthy Serbs from the Austrian Empire and the Ottoman Sultan Abdülaziz (in the amount of 25,000 groschen).

Vidovdan massacre 
Mostar was part of the Nazi puppet state known as the Independent State of Croatia, along with the rest of Bosnia and Herzegovina. The Ustasha fascist government was led by Ante Pavelić in Zagreb, and its view of Serbs was akin to the Nazi German view of Jews. The persecution of the town's Serbs began in the summer of 1941. The events of June 24–28, 1941 are known by Serbs as the "Vidovdan slaughter", as June 28 is Vidovdan in the Serbian Orthodox calendar.

Mass arrests of town's Serbs by the Ustashas began on the afternoon of June 24, 1941. The most prominent Serb traders, teachers, and priests of the Serbian Orthodox Church were among those arrested, as well as workers and farmers, some 450 in total from the 24 to 26 June 1941. Some were killed on the night following the beginning of the arrests, while some were thrown into cave-pits and others were killed on the banks of the Neretva river. Almost thirty of Mostar's Serb citizens were thrown into a cave-pit above the village of Čitluk, about 10 km from the town. Many others - at least 160 people - were stabbed to death or beaten to death with large rocks, mallets and metal bars. The entire brotherhood of Žitomislić monastery was arrested by the Ustasha on 27 June 1941, and driven to the village of Blizanci, where they were tortured and killed, some being thrown alive into the Vidonja cave-pit. Serbs in the villages surrounding Mostar were also targeted and murdered. In the following months, many Serbs from Mostar and the surrounding area were transported to Ustasha concentration camps, mainly Jasenovac, while many others fled to Nazi-occupied Serbia. Around 8,000 Serbs lived in Mostar before the massacres started on 24 June 1941, and by the end of August only around 850 remained.

Culture

Serb singing society "Gusle"
The Serb singing society "Gusle" was founded on December 18, 1888 in Mostar. There were 50 founding members, with Jovo R. Šola (Јово Р. Шола) chosen as the first president of the society.

Zora
Zora was a Serb literary magazine founded in 1896, central to Mostar's reputation as a centre of culture. Its full name was Zora: Časopis za zabavu, pokuku i kulturu (Зора: Часопис за забаву, поуку и књижевност).

Churches

During the Bosnian War of 1992-95, the Serbian Orthodox Cathedral of the Holy Trinity and the Church of the Birth of the Most Holy Virgin, both dating to the mid-19th century, were demolished by the Croatian Defence Forces. The cathedral was also known as the New Orthodox Church, while the latter was known as the Old Orthodox Church. According to the Chairman of the Council of Ministers of Bosnia and Herzegovina, Nikola Špirić, the reconstruction of the cathedral is due to begin in Spring 2008, and will be partially funded by King Charles III of the United Kingdom.

In early 2008, the city administration promised to set aside 100,000 KM (about 50,000 euros) for the reconstruction of the cathedral, and the Ministry of Culture of the Federation of Bosnia and Herzegovina entity pledged 200,000 convertible marks (about 100,000 euros), while a local attorney, Faruk Ćupina (a Bosnian Muslim), was the first private citizen to donate any money - 10,000 convertible marks (about 5,000 euros). The estimated total cost of the project is 15 million convertible marks (about 7.5 million euros).

Notable people
 Aleksa Šantić, poet
 Jovan Dučić, poet
 Osman Đikić, poet
 Vladimir Gaćinović, Young Bosnia member
 Veselin Gatalo, poet
 Svetozar Ćorović, historian
 Vladimir Ćorović, historian
 Tibor Živković, historian
 Nedeljko Gvozdenović, painter
 Radomir Damnjanović Damnjan, painter
 Svetislav Mandić, historian, poet and painter
 Vito Nikolić, poet and journalist
 Gordan Mihić, playwright
 Sima Milutinović, aeronautical engineer
 Veselin Misita, military officer
 Dušan Bajević, football player and coach
 Željko Samardžić, singer
 Branka Sovrlić, singer
 Sergej Trifunović, actor
 Miroslav Čovilo, footballer
 Siniša Mladenović, footballer
 Borislav Džaković, basketball coach
 Dražen Dalipagić, basketball coach
 Nemanja Gordić, basketball player
 Dejan Kravić, basketball player
 Dragiša Vučinić, basketball player

See also 
 Serbs of Bosnia and Herzegovina
 Žitomislić Monastery

References 

Serbs of Bosnia and Herzegovina